USS Guitarro has been the name of more than one United States Navy ship, and may refer to:

, a submarine in commission from 1944 to 1945, from 1952 to 1953, and in 1954
, a submarine in commission from 1972 to 1992

United States Navy ship names